Living Dangerously is a 1936 British drama film directed by Herbert Brenon and starring Otto Kruger, Leonora Corbett and Francis Lister. It was made at Elstree Studios.

The film's sets were designed by the art director Cedric Dawe. In New York City a successful doctor shoots dead a man who calls at his apartment one night, then explains to his friend the district attorney the reason: He and the dead man had run a medical practice in London which was broken up amidst charges of medical malpractice.

Cast
 Otto Kruger as Dr. Stanley Norton  
 Leonora Corbett as Helen Pryor  
 Francis Lister as Dr. Henry Pryor  
 Aileen Marson as Vera Kennedy  
 Lawrence Anderson as Lloyd  
 Eric Stanley as Sir George Parker  
 Charles Mortimer as Inspector Webster  
 Hubert Harben as President of Council  
 Iris Hoey as Lady Annesley  
 James Carew as Lingard  
 Jimmy Godden as Member of Council  
 Hartley Power as District Attorney  
 Hilda Campbell-Russell as Nurse

Reception
Writing for The Spectator in 1936, Graham Greene gave the film a good review describing it as "quite worth watching for [] at local cinemas". Claiming that the film is "not a very satisfying film", Greene was nevertheless impressed by the criticisms the film made against the legal system and he noted that although "we are used to America criticizing her institutions on the screen, [] it is unusual [in England] for a picture with some bite and bitterness to get past the censor."

References

Bibliography
 Low, Rachael. Filmmaking in 1930s Britain. George Allen & Unwin, 1985.
 Wood, Linda. British Films, 1927-1939. British Film Institute, 1986.

External links

1936 films
British drama films
1936 drama films
1930s English-language films
Films shot at British International Pictures Studios
Films directed by Herbert Brenon
Films set in London
British black-and-white films
1930s British films